Orophia roseoflavida is a species of moth in the family Depressariidae. It was described by Walsingham in 1881, and is known from South Africa.

References

Endemic moths of South Africa
Moths described in 1881
Orophia
Moths of Africa